Allotalanta autophaea is a moth of the family Cosmopterigidae. It is found in Turkey.

Adults are on wing in June.

References

Moths described in 1913
Cosmopteriginae
Endemic fauna of Turkey
Moths of Asia